Kapulani Landgraf (born 1966) is a Kanaka Maoli (native Hawaiian) artist who is best known for her work in black-and-white photography. Through a series of photographic essays, objects, and installations, Landgraf celebrates Native Hawaiian culture while also addressing the legacies of colonialism and its impact on indigenous Hawaiian rights, value and history. While her work often centers on the negative impacts of land use and development, she also alludes to the resilience of the land and the indigenous population. Landgraf says about her work, "Although much of my work laments the violations on the Hawaiian people, land and natural resources, it also offers hope with allusions to the strength and resilience of Hawaiian land and its people.” Landgraf's most recent work combines photographic series with objects and installations.

Education 
She received a BA in anthropology from the University of Hawaii at Manoa in 1989 and an MFA in Visual Arts from the Vermont College of Fine Arts in 1995. She currently teaches in the Arts and Humanities department at Kapiolani Community College in Honolulu, HI.

Creative work 
In her 1994 book, Nā Wahi Pana O Ko'olau Poko: Legendary Places of Ko'olau Poko, Landraf refutes the tradition of landscape photography of Hawaiian spaces, instead linking place to native Hawaiian ways of knowing and understanding the sacred. In her book, Asian Settler Colonialism From Local Governance to the Habits of Everyday Life in Hawaii, Landgraf describes the history of colonisation in Hawaii, and the effects it has had on the identity of Kanaka Maoli people. Her work is political in nature, emphasizing Hawaiian claims to land and speaks against the continued commodification of the islands by settler groups.
Landgraf's work has toured across the United States in the Changing Hands: Art Without Reservation collection. In 2013 Landgraf was awarded the Native Arts and Culture Foundation fellowship. Upon receipt of this award, Landgraf remarked, "The Native Arts and Cultures Artist Fellowship validated artwork created by a Native Hawaiian artist working in Hawai'i on a national scale [...] I hope the national award brings a greater awareness and interest to the realities and injusticies, which continue to occur in Hawai'i and within the Native Hawaiian community. I also hope it inspires and instigates younger Native Hawaiian artists to go beyond the decorative – to give voice and challenge – to push the boundaries – to make people think."

Her photo collage ho 'opa 'a a pa 'a from 2004, in the collection of the Honolulu Museum of Art looks abstract from a distance.  However, a close inspection (see image of detail) reveals that it is composed of photographs that relate to the Native Hawaiian people politically, culturally, and historically.  The Bishop Museum (Honolulu, Hawaii), the Honolulu Museum of Art, and the Institute of American Indian Arts (Santa Fe, New Mexico) are among the public collections holding work by Kapulani Landgraf.

 1999 -  En Foco New Works Photography Award
 1996 -  State Foundation on Culture & Arts Fellowship
 1995 -  Ka Palapala Pu’ukela Award
 1994 – Roy Levin – Jessica Lutz Award, Vermont College
 1991 – Image XVI “Kodak Eastman Award, Hawaii

LANI 
During the 2013 NACF Artists fellowship in Visual Arts, Landgraf showcased an artwork that spelled out LANI, a Hawaiian word that translates most similarly to heavens, sky, or spiritual. The artwork was part of an installation under the name “Ka Maunu Pololoi? or “The Right bait? and consists of 40 rat traps on the floor to a wall and interconnected to one another. The rat traps were attached to photographs of other artwork commissioned by Kanaka Maoli and pieces of fake money. In 2013 the Honolulu Museum of Art exhibited Ponoiwi, a solo exhibition which takes a stand against the decades-long practice of removing sand from Hawaiian beaches, which often desecrates native burial sites.

Ē Luku Wale Ē 
Landgraf is the co-author, with Windward Community College art professor and humanities chair Mark Hamasaki, of Ē Luku Wale Ē (Devastation Upon Devastation), a book published in 2016 documenting through photographs the final stages of construction of the H-3 freeway. Photos from this book were exhibited at the 2022 Hawaii Triennial at the Hawaii State Art Museum.

'Au'a 
In 2019, Landgraf made a collection called “ ‘Au’a.” Landgraf's collection is one part of four pieces of the “Honolulu Biennial 2019 works at the Honolulu Museum of Art.”  ‘Au’a is a collection of 108 photographic portraits of Native Hawaiians who have made a positive impact on change in Hawaii. “The 108 participants in this 2019 project are artists, activists, friends, community leaders, and academic colleagues.” Written across the participants face and neck is, "I am not American." A reference of chanted words from Doctor Haunani K. Trask. Doctor Trask said this chant at the Iolani Palace in 1993. Landgraf got the idea for the concept in 2012 when she went to a “National Endowment for the Humanities Bridging Cultures Conference,” and saw that there was no Native Hawaiian perspective there. People got up and said their message with the opening being “I am a proud American.” When it was time for Landgraf, she opened by saying “I am not American.” She was met with confusion and others disagreeing.  It was not easy for Landgraf to get participants for her project, she was met with refusals.They risked losing their jobs, the politics behind it, and being too close to home for them as well. They feared family, friends, and  colleagues would see and not agree with them. The message behind this piece is the, “native Hawaiian people stepped up to disclaim America.”

References 

1966 births
Living people
Photographers from Hawaii
University of Hawaiʻi at Mānoa alumni
Vermont College of Fine Arts alumni
University of Hawaiʻi faculty